Catfish: The TV Show (often shortened to Catfish) is an American reality-based documentary television series airing on MTV about the truths and lies of online dating. The series is based on the 2010 film Catfish and premiered on November 12, 2012. It is co-hosted by Nev Schulman and Kamie Crawford. Max Joseph served as a co-host for the show's first seven seasons; his last episode aired on August 22, 2018. Crawford was a guest co-host in numerous episodes of season 7 and joined the main cast in the show's 8th season, alongside Schulman.

In May 2018, filming of season 7 was suspended due to sexual misconduct allegations against Schulman. The suspension was lifted after the allegations were found to be "not credible".

In 2020 MTV and Wondery began releasing episodes as podcasts under the title Catfish: The Podcast, with the first episode released on November 26, 2020.

Premise

On the internet, a "catfish" is someone who creates fake personal profiles on social sites using someone else's pictures and false biographical information to pretend to be someone else. These "catfish" usually intend to trick people into falling in love with them. The term "catfish" is derived from the title of the 2010 documentary, in which filmmaker Schulman discovers that the woman with whom he'd been having an online relationship had not been honest in describing herself.

MTV and the Catfish film's producers, Schulman and Joseph, help people who are emotionally entangled with someone they have never met in real life. Each episode is an investigation into whether the other participant in the virtual relationship is legitimate or a "catfish". Some couples have been communicating for a few months—others, for years.

Schulman has said that he has received requests from people asking him for his help in determining whether their online-only lovers are lying or truthful about their identities. In each episode, the hosts help a different person with a different story, traveling to their residence and using background checks and research to uncover the truth. The hosts contact the other person to arrange a first meeting between the two virtual lovers, then document how both people are affected. Schulman has said that the show is not all about pulling the rug out from under people, explaining:

Presenters
The program was hosted by Nev Schulman and Max Joseph for the first seven seasons. Joseph left the program in August 2018, halfway through the seventh season. For the remaining episodes of the seventh season that aired in 2019, he was replaced by alternate presenters, including singer Elle King, model / actress Selita Ebanks, basketball player Nick Young, actress Kimiko Glenn, model Slick Woods, actress Tallulah Willis, and presenter Kamie Crawford. When the eighth season began in January 2020, Crawford was chosen as the permanent new presenter.

Notable guests
 Eddie Schmidt as Himself, also one of the producers of the Catfish: The TV Show

Production
The show presents the "hopeful" as the one who initiates contact in an attempt to discover the true identity of their online romance, or "catfish". Some of the show's casting calls solicit stories from hopefuls. Casting director Michael Esposito has said that the show has received more than 100 applications a day.

According to a 2013 Hollywood.com report, it is usually the catfish who makes the first contact with MTV. Producers then proceed to gather information about the deception from the catfish and contact the hopeful afterwards. For legal reasons, everyone involved in the series signs a contract agreeing to appear on camera before the episode enters production. In Season 3's Miranda and Camryn episode, the catfish changed their mind about meeting the hopeful, and appeared only by Skype.

The hosts are given no information about the catfish, and while the catfish has agreed to appear on the show, they do not know when or how the hosts will be looking for them. Schulman has said of the show's reverse-engineering:

Series overview

Spin-offs
There have been two "Catfish" spin-offs. The first, Catfish: Trolls, was hosted by celebrity artist Charlamagne tha God and featured online personalities confronting trolls who had been harassing them online. It aired for one three-episode season in 2018. The second spinoff, Ghosted: Love Gone Missing, is hosted by The Bachelorette Rachel Lindsay and celebrity rapper Travis Mills and features stories about people trying to find former friends or romantic partners after having been ghosted.

Reception
The film Catfish was criticized and its authenticity questioned. Executive producer Tom Forman stresses that the TV version won't just tell "stories of deception. We've also stumbled into some love stories. We found people who are exactly who they say they are. We are putting those on television, too. We find people who are willing to get past an initial deception and really do make a connection at the end—in person and in real life. That's been really heartwarming. So, I think, when we set out, we really don't know how it's going to end: good, bad, or in the middle somewhere".

International versions

In January 2016, MTV began casting a proposed UK version of the show through online ads that specifically targeted the catfish, not the hopeful: "Tired of keeping secrets from your online love? Come clean" and "Are you a secret Catfish? It's time to come clean". The project was cancelled, but Schulman has said he would like to make a pan-European version.

In August 2019, Network 10 chose to cancel its Australian version of Catfish which was going to be hosted by Casey Donovan.

See also
Catfish effect

References

External links

2012 American television series debuts
2010s American reality television series
2020s American reality television series
American dating and relationship reality television series
Television series about social media
English-language television shows
MTV reality television series
Live action television shows based on films